Pindar's First Pythian Ode is an ancient Greek epinicion praising  Hiero of Syracuse for a victory in the Pythian Games. The poem's occasion is Hiero's victory in the chariot race of 470 BC, corresponding to the foundation of the city of Aetna which is also praised by the poet.

Hiero of Syracuse
Hiero, tyrant of Syracuse, had been the recipient of Pindar's First Olympian Ode in 476 BC. His victory in the Pythian games comes in the wake of a number of significant military accomplishments: his defeat of the Carthaginians at the Battle of Himera and of the Etruscans in the naval Battle of Cumae. Both events are alluded to in the poem. Special attention, however, is afforded to Hiero's foundation of the city of Aetna. He had founded the settlement near Mount Etna for his son Deinomenes the Younger to rule and proclaimed himself one of its citizens upon winning the chariot race at Delphi.

Typhon
Most of Pindar's victory odes contain a mythical narrative as part of their encomiastic strategy. Pythian 1 features the story of Typhon, a mythical giant who challenged Zeus' primacy and was consequently buried beneath Mount Etna. The poem envisions his imprisonment as the cause for a volcanic eruption of Etna, which it then goes on to describe. The eruption constitutes an elaborate ecphrasis and has been considered by critics to be central to the poem's interpretation.

References

Works Cited
Fearn, D. (2017) Pindar's Eyes (Oxford)
Nisetich, F. (1980) Pindar's Victory Songs (Baltimore)
Race, W. (1997) Pindar: Olympian Odes. Pythian Odes (Cambridge, MA)

Panhellenic Games
Ancient Olympic Games
Ancient Greek poems